Headland is the largest city in Henry County, Alabama, United States. It is part of the Dothan metropolitan area. In 2020, the population was 4,973, up from 4,510 in the 2010 census. Ray Marler is the current mayor.

History
James Joshua Head (1839–1927) founded Headland in 1871 as "Head's Land". He patented land, plotted the town and built his home there. The Headland post office opened on October 10, 1871.

The Headland Public Square was laid off in 1871 by Head with a vision for a branch courthouse. Henry County voters decided in the 1879 and 1885 courthouse site elections not to locate a courthouse on the public square. Henry has been Alabama's only county with three courthouses at the same time.

Head sold Headland to Hosey C. Powell in 1879, who sold to Dr. Wyatt S. Oates in 1880. Head moved to Tampa, Florida, in 1883 and later established Lake Magdalene, Florida.

Headland incorporated in 1884 with 26 white and 4 Black petitioners. The railroad was built in 1893 along with the Seaboard Coast Line Railroad Depot. The depot was added to the National Register of Historic Places on September 4, 1980. It has since been disassembled.

Headland's The Spirit of the American Doughboy statue was the first public statue in Henry County. It was erected on the square in 1926 as a tribute to the town's military dead. The square was paved in 1935.

As of the 1960 U.S. census, Headland had grown into Henry County's largest city, narrowly edging out Abbeville, which had been the largest since Dothan was removed into Houston County in 1903. Headland lost that distinction to Abbeville again in 1970, but regained it in 1980 and has since solidified its hold. In 2000, it broke Dothan's then-Henry County 1900 record of 3,275 residents with 3,523 and added nearly 1,000 more by 2010.

Geography
Headland is located in the southwest corner of Henry County at  (31.353410, -85.339793). It is bordered to the south by the city of Dothan and town of Kinsey in Houston County and to the west by Dale County.

U.S. Route 431, a four-lane highway, passes through the east side of Headland, leading south  to the center of Dothan and north  to Abbeville. Alabama State Route 134 runs through the center of Headland, leading east  to Columbia next to the Georgia line, and west  to Midland City.

Climate

Demographics

2010 census
As of the census of 2010, there were 4,510 people, 1,799 households, and 1,291 families residing in the city. The racial makeup of the city was 70.1% White, 27.5% Black or African American, 0.4% Native American, 0.3% Asian, 0.6% from other races, and 1.2% from two or more races. 1.4% of the population were Hispanic or Latino of any race.

There were 1,799 households, out of which 30.1% had children under the age of 18 living with them, 50.1% were married couples living together, 17.7% had a female householder with no husband present, and 28.2% were non-families. 25.3% of all households were made up of individuals, and 12.3% had someone living alone who was 65 years of age or older. The average household size was 2.50 and the average family size was 2.99.

In the city, the age distribution of the population shows 25.6% under the age of 18, 6.7% from 18 to 24, 26.6% from 25 to 44, 27.0% from 45 to 64, and 14.1% who were 65 years of age or older. The median age was 38.3 years. For every 100 females, there were 83.7 males. For every 100 females age 18 and over, there were 82.9 males.

The median income for a household in the city was $45,813, and the median income for a family was $50,120. Males had a median income of $37,025 versus $30,734 for females. The per capita income for the city was $20,304. About 13.6% of families and 12.1% of the population were below the poverty line, including 8.7% of those under age 18 and 20.7% of those age 65 or over.

2020 census

As of the 2020 United States census, there were 4,973 people, 1,583 households, and 1,131 families residing in the city.

Education 
Headland is a part of the Henry County Public Schools system. It operates Headland Elementary School (K-5), Headland Middle School (6-9) and Headland High School (10-12).

Sports
Headland was home to the Headland Dixie Runners, a Minor League Baseball team in the Alabama State League/Alabama–Florida League from 1950 to 1952.

Headland was also the home to the 2016 Dixie Youth Baseball World Champions.

Notable people

 M. Watt Espy, death penalty historian
 W. Thomas West, former major general in the U.S. Air Force
 Charles Woods, businessman and political candidate
 Miss Alabama USA, Pamela Flowers, Miss Headland 1973, Miss Alabama USA 1975, 1st runner-up to Miss USA, Miss Photogenic
 Miss Alabama USA, Keisha Walding, Miss Headland 2000, Miss Alabama USA 2008

Photo gallery

References

External links

 Headland, Alabama Chamber of Commerce

Cities in Alabama
Cities in Henry County, Alabama
Dothan metropolitan area, Alabama